The following are the national records in athletics in Bangladesh maintained by the Bangladesh Athletic Federation (BAF).

Outdoor

Key to tables:

h = hand timing

NWI = no wind information

Men

Women

Indoor

Men

Women

Notes

References

External links
BAF web site

Bangladesh
Records
Athletics